Robert Leonard Knight (born 20 November 1957 in Launceston, Tasmania) is a former Australian cricketer, who played for Tasmania from 1977 until 1982. He was a right-handed batsman.

See also
 List of Tasmanian representative cricketers

External links
Cricinfo Profile

1957 births
Living people
Australian cricketers
Tasmania cricketers
Cricketers from Launceston, Tasmania